The 2007 Team Ice Racing World Championship was the 29th edition of the Team World Championship. The final was held on ?, 2007, in Saransk, in Russia. Russia won their 13th title.

Final Classification

See also 
 2007 Individual Ice Speedway World Championship
 2007 Speedway World Cup in classic speedway
 2007 Speedway Grand Prix in classic speedway

References 

Ice speedway competitions
World